Fiona Bernadette Fox  (born 12 November 1964) is a British writer and chief executive of the Science Media Centre.

Career
Fox became head of media at CAFOD in 1995. 

In December 2001 Fox was appointed the founding director of the Science Media Centre, based at the Royal Institution of Great Britain in London and its current chief executive.

In that capacity she has been a regular media commentator and gave evidence at the Leveson Inquiry into press standards in the UK in 2012.

Awards
Fox was appointed Officer of the Order of the British Empire (OBE) in the 2013 Birthday Honours for services to science.

Personal life
Fox was born into an Irish Catholic family in Mancot, near Hawarden, North Wales. She has two older sisters, one of whom is Claire Fox. She is a supporter of Celtic F.C. and is married to political commentator and teacher Kevin Rooney.  She was formerly a member of the Revolutionary Communist Party.

Published works

References

External links
 Profile at SourceWatch

1964 births
Living people
People educated at St Richard Gwyn Catholic High School, Flint
People from Hawarden
Revolutionary Communist Party (UK, 1978) members
British public relations people
Officers of the Order of the British Empire